French-Hungarian relations are foreign relations between France and Hungary.  The first diplomatic contacts date back to the Middle Ages. Both countries are full members of NATO and the European Union. Since 2004, Hungary is an observer in La Francophonie.

Education 
There is a French international school in Budapest, Gustave Eiffel French School of Budapest.

Resident diplomatic missions 
 France has an embassy in Budapest.
 Hungary has an embassy in Paris.

See also  
 Foreign relations of France
 Foreign relations of Hungary
 Hungarian diaspora
 French people in Hungary
 Accession of Hungary to the European Union

References

External links 
 French Foreign Ministry about relations with Hungary 
  French embassy in Budapest (in French and Hungarian only)
 Hungarian embassy in Paris (in French and Hungarian only) 
  Hungarian honorary consulate in Mulhouse (in French only)

 

 
Hungary 
Bilateral relations of Hungary